The Undaunted is a Canadian docudrama television series, which aired on CBC Television in 1983. The series dramatized several key figures in Canadian history, including episodes on Humphrey Gilbert's role in the founding of Newfoundland; the establishment of the Red River Colony by Thomas Douglas, 5th Earl of Selkirk; the destruction and reconstruction of the Fortress of Louisbourg; and the explorations of Alexander Mackenzie.

The episode on Humphrey Gilbert won the ACTRA Award for Best Television Program at the 13th ACTRA Awards in 1984.

References

1980s Canadian documentary television series
1980s Canadian drama television series
1983 Canadian television series debuts
1983 Canadian television series endings
CBC Television original programming